Rudi Widodo (born 13 July 1983, in Pati) is an Indonesian professional footballer who plays as a forward for Liga 2 club Persipa Pati.

Honours

Country honors
Indonesia
 Indonesian Independence Cup: 2008

Club
Persija Jakarta
 Liga 1: 2018
 Indonesia President's Cup: 2018

References

External links
 

1983 births
Living people
Indonesian Muslims
People from Pati Regency
Indonesian footballers
Indonesia international footballers
Indonesian Premier Division players
Liga 1 (Indonesia) players
Liga 2 (Indonesia) players
Persiku Kudus players
Persijatim players
PSS Sleman players
Persiter Ternate players
Persis Solo players
Pelita Jaya FC players
Persibo Bojonegoro players
Sriwijaya F.C. players
Persela Lamongan players
PSPS Pekanbaru players
Persiba Balikpapan players
Persikabo Bogor players
Persebaya Surabaya players
Bhayangkara F.C. players
Persija Jakarta players
Persipa Pati players
Association football forwards
Sportspeople from Central Java